Inland Rail, also known as Inland Railway and previously Australian Inland Railway Expressway, is a  railway line under construction in Australia. Once complete, it will connect the ports of Melbourne and Brisbane along a new route west of the mountainous Great Dividing Range, bypassing the busy Sydney metropolitan area and allowing for the use of double-stacked freight trains. The route will also connect to the Sydney–Perth rail corridor, reducing journey times between Brisbane, Adelaide and Perth.

History

Early proposals

In the 20th century, several proposals were made for an inland railway route connecting the east coast of Australia. In 1915, Prime Minister Andrew Fisher proposed a "strategic railway" connecting the South Australian city of Port Augusta to Brisbane, with connections to the New South Wales railway network, at an estimated cost of A£6,500,000. In 1979, TNT founder Ken Thomas proposed a route connecting Brisbane to Melbourne via Wallangarra, Orange and Albury, with possible connections to Adelaide and Perth.

Later proposals
In 1995, Queensland Rail detailed a $1.289 billion (equivalent to $ billion in ) proposal for an inland railway corridor connecting Brisbane and Melbourne.

In 1996, the Bureau of Transport and Communications Economics (BTCE) released a working paper assessing the proposal. It found a new route would save ten hours journey time on the existing coastal route via Sydney, reducing the operating cost for operators from $23.16/tonne to $17.56/tonne, but would facilitate only a small increase in grain production.

In May 2008, the newly-elected Rudd Government allocated $15 million to the Australian Rail Track Corporation (ARTC) to develop a route alignment following the Far Western sub-corridor as detailed in the 2006 study. The Corporation's preliminary analysis was released in May 2009, which showed that the cheapest version of the inland railway would cost $2.8 billion to build and would allow freight to be moved from Melbourne to Brisbane in just over 27 hours. Despite this, the analysis also found that, if operational by 2020, the project's costs would outweigh any economic benefits by up to $1.1 billion.

The ARTC's final report was released in July 2010. The report forecast a delivery cost of $3.688 billion, with track duplication works between Junee and Melbourne and capacity for double-stacked freight trains between Melbourne and Parkes already budgeted by the ARTC.

Approval and funding
The Gillard Government announced forward estimates of $300 million in the 2011 federal budget commencing 2014, with the Coalition committing to the funding following the election of the Abbott Government in 2013. A further $594 million was allocated to ARTC by the Turnbull Government in the 2016 federal budget to purchase land for the project, with an additional $8.4 billion in funding over seven years announced in the subsequent 2017 budget.

In the 2020 federal budget, the Morrison Government pledged $150 million in funding for additional grade separation works in New South Wales, conditional upon a further $37.5 million commitment from the New South Wales state government.

Route

The proposed route will connect the rail yard at Tottenham, Victoria with the freight yards at Acacia Ridge and Bromelton, using a combination of new and existing standard gauge and dual gauge track. Upgrades to existing track will facilitate the use of double-stacked container trains between the three yards.

Victoria

In Victoria, the Inland Rail route will follow the existing North East railway line and Albion–Jacana railway line alignment.

Additional works in the corridor include:
 Replacing or modifying 12 railway bridges between Beveridge and Albury. 

New South Wales

From Albury, the route continues along the Main South railway line to Illabo.

A further  of track has been upgraded between Parkes and Narromine, in addition to the construction of a new  connection with the Broken Hill railway line west of Parkes allowing services to connect to Adelaide and Perth.

Replace or modify nn overbridges between Albury and Junee. 

 of track between Narromine and Narrabri will be built along a new alignment, and is the longest stage of the project.

Queensland

The sections of the route between the New South Wales—Queensland border and the termini at Bromelton and Acacia Ridge total  and will be built as dual gauge, improving services on both the interstate standard gauge and Queensland narrow gauge networks.

South-west of Yelarbon, the Inland Rail route joins the alignment of the South Western railway line where it extends to south of Inglewood, with a new alignment connecting the now-closed Millmerran line north-east of Millmerran. New track will be built between Southbrook and Gowrie Junction, with the route bypassing Toowoomba  to Helidon on a new line  and then along an upgraded Western line as far east as Calvert and new line 53km  to Kagaru. The existing dual gauge North Coast line of NSW between Acacia Ridge and Bromelton will also be upgraded to allow for double-stacked freight containers.

Tunnels 

There are three tunnels in Queensland, which allow for double-stack rail transport and dual gauge and single-track railway. These are:

 Teviot Range Tunnel Inland Railway	        1100m	
 Little Liverpool Range Tunnel Inland Railway	 850m	
 Toowoomba Range Tunnel Inland Railway	        6000m

These tunnels replace the original narrow gauge only tunnels between Grandchester and Toowoomba with a faster and more maintainable alignment.

Construction

Chronology
In October 2018, INLink, a joint-venture between BMD Constructions and Fulton Hogan, was awarded a $310 million contract for stage 1 of the project between Parkes and Narromine. Work on the Parkes–Narromine railway line and the new Broken Hill railway line connection commenced in December 2018. More than 1,800 people were employed on the project, with works completed in September 2020.

Opposition to construction
The Narrabri and Baradine Aboriginal Land Councils have stated their opposition to the Narromine to Narrabri section of the project, planned to be built on an alignment through the Pilliga forests which contain various Aboriginal heritage sites. A route through the Pilliga forests was announced by Minister for Infrastructure, Darren Chester, in November 2017, despite initial plans by the ARTC to build the line through surrounding farmland.

Landholders and farmers have opposed several sections of the project on environmental grounds. In September 2017, Chester announced the Yelarbon to Gowrie section would be built through the Condamine River floodplain, which reached its highest recorded level in the 2010–11 Queensland floods. As a consequence, the Inland Rail project was referred to the Senate Rural and Regional Affairs and Transport References Committee in 2019, with the committee chair, Senator Glenn Sterle, critical of ARTC for a lack of consultation with communities along the alignment. Although the ARTC reaffirmed the Yelarbon to Gowrie route would remain across the floodplain, in June 2020, Deputy Prime Minister, Michael McCormack, ordered a review of the alignment.

In July 2020, the New South Wales branch of the Country Women's Association, along with the NSW Farmers' Association, commenced legal proceedings against ARTC, seeking an independent hydrology review into the Narromine to Narrabri stage of the project.

See also 
 Adelaide–Darwin rail corridor, a similar north-south rail corridor connecting inland Australia
 Rail transport in Australia
 ATMS will be fitted to those sections not fitted with regular signalling such as CTC.
 Railway tunnels in Queensland, Australia
 Main range tunnels

References

Bibliography

External links
 Submissions to Senate Inquiry into Inland Rail

Interstate rail in Australia
Proposed railway lines in Australia
Rail transport in New South Wales
Rail transport in Queensland
Rail transport in Victoria (Australia)
2026 in rail transport